Beacon Street is a major thoroughfare in Boston, Massachusetts and its western suburbs Brookline and Newton. It passes through many of Boston's central and western neighborhoods, including Beacon Hill, Back Bay, Fenway–Kenmore, the Boston University campus, Brighton, and Chestnut Hill.

It is not to be confused with the Beacon Street in nearby Somerville or others elsewhere.

Description
Beacon Street begins as a one-way street from the intersection of Tremont Street and School Street.  From this point, it rises up Beacon Hill for a block where it meets Park Street in front of the Massachusetts State House.  From that intersection it descends Beacon Hill as a two-lane, bi-directional street until it reaches Charles Street.  At Charles Street, it becomes a one-way avenue that runs through the Back Bay neighborhood until it reaches Kenmore Square.

From Kenmore Square, Beacon Street skirts the area around Fenway Park and follows a southwesterly slant through Brookline along either side of the MBTA Green Line trolley tracks to Cleveland Circle in Brighton.  From there it passes through Chestnut Hill, including the Chestnut Hill Reservoir and Boston College. It winds its way into the city of Newton, where it crosses Centre Street to form the defining intersection of Newton Centre, meets Walnut Street at "Four Corners" near the Newton Cemetery, and goes through Waban at its intersection with Woodward Street. It ends at Washington Street near Boston's circumferential highway, Route 128.

History

Beacon Street initially formed the northern limit of Boston Common, and was extended over the Charles River Basin as a dam that would later form the shore between a narrowed river and the newly filled-in Back Bay neighborhood. The part of Beacon Street west of Kenmore Square was originally laid out in 1850.  Railroad tracks were first laid in 1888 for what would eventually become the modern Green Line C branch.

In July 2020, the state awarded $32,000 for a feasibility study and conceptual design of restoration of the original bridle path, which ran along the median of the Brookline portion.

In popular culture
 Robert McCloskey's 1941 children's book Make Way for Ducklings features a mother duck leading her eight ducklings across Beacon Street, with the help of four members of the Boston Police Department.
 The Beacon Street Girls series of preteen books is set around Beacon Street in Brookline.
 Nanci Griffith's 1987  album Lone Star State of Mind has a song called Beacon Street.
 Beacon Street is the location of the fictional pizza parlor "Beacon Street Pizza" during the first season of the sitcom Two Guys and a Girl.
 112½ is the address of the fictional bar Cheers. The actual location of the exterior shots is 84 Beacon Street.
 The Unitarian Universalist Association managed to confuse the numbers on this street. In 1927, moving from 25 Beacon Street down the street, they wanted to keep the number 25, and convinced the legislature to pass a law to keep it.
 In Rick Riordan's Magnus Chase and the Gods of Asgard, a main character owns a shop on Beacon Street and the shop appears several times throughout the series.
 14 Beacon Street was used in the series Ally McBeal as the exterior location for the law firm "Cage & Fish" (later "Cage, Fish, & McBeal"), which was located on the 7th floor of this building.

Image gallery

See also

 Amory–Ticknor House
 Nathan Appleton Residence
 Beacon Street Girls
 Boston Athenæum
 Boston Bar Association
 Boston Common
 Boston Public Garden
 Boston Transit Commission Building
 Cheers Beacon Hill
 Chester Harding House
 Cleveland Circle
 Dean Road station
 Gibson House Museum
 Hancock Manor
 Headquarters House (Boston, Massachusetts)
 Harrison Gray Otis House
 Oliver Wendell Holmes, Sr. lived on Beacon St. 1871–1894
 Julia Ward Howe lived on Beacon St.
 Kenmore Square
 Leavitt-Riedler Pumping Engine
 Massachusetts State House
 Mount Vernon Church, Boston
 Myles Annex
 Myles Standish Hall
 One Beacon Street
 Page Company, former tenant
 John Phillips (mayor) lived on Beacon St. (corner of Walnut Street), 1804–1823
 William H. Prescott lived on Beacon St. 1845–1859
 Robert Gould Shaw Memorial
 Somerset Club
 Washington Square (Boston)

References

External links

 
 New York Public Library. Postcard of Unitarian Building, 25 Beacon Street Boston, Headquarters American Unitarian Association. Also shows State House, Hotel Bellevue, early 20th century

Beacon Hill, Boston
Streets in Boston